Just Keep Runnin' is a punk rock album by the Poway, California band Agent 51. It was first released in 2000 on the band's own Suburban Hooligans Records label, then was re-released in 2001 by Adeline Records with additional tracks. It was the band's second album and expanded their punk rock sound to include influences of classic rock and heavy metal. It also greatly expanded the band's secret agent mythos, with the liner notes extensively detailing the comic book-style secret origins of the band and its members. According to the story, the band members were rogue secret agents with psychic, cybernetic and alien-enhanced abilities who were struggling against a secret government organization known as "The Agency." The Agency sought to use satellites to control the minds of Earth's population, and Agent 51's mission was to expose the Agency's secrets to the general public disguised as an ordinary rock band. The songs "C.I.A.F.B.I." and "Psychic Spies" dealt directly with this theme. The songs "The Last Pirate Standing", "Free-Wheel" and "Who's Gunna Riot?" had been part of the band's live set for several years under the titles "The Pirate Song", "Free-Wheel Burning" and "Riot."

Reception
Stewart Mason of Allmusic gave Just Keep Runnin' three stars out of five, calling it "basically insubstantial, but a lot of fun" and saying that the band has "a Dickies-like tongue-in-cheek quality".

Track listing

Personnel

Band
Chris Armes – guitar, vocals, art design and illustration
Eric "E-Rock" Davis – guitar, vocals
Greg Schneider – bass guitar, vocals (tracks 1–18); story and layout
Michael "Mikey L" Levinson – drums
Sean Scura – bass guitar, vocals (tracks 19 and 20)

Additional musicians
Shawn Stern of Youth Brigade (band) - backing vocals on "Straight Outta Hell" (original release only)

Production
Dan de las Isla – mastering
Chris Armes and Greg Hewitt – art design and illustration

References

2000 albums
2001 albums
Agent 51 albums
Adeline Records albums